is a Japanese actress, singer, and novelist. Matsui is a former member of the Japanese idol girl groups SKE48 and Nogizaka46. As a member of the former, she also participated in the main lineup of AKB48's singles. As an actress, she has played roles in numerous films and television series, including Kamen Rider Build the Movie: Be the One and the 99th NHK asadora Manpuku.

Early life 

Matsui was born in Toyohashi, Aichi Prefecture on July 27, 1991. She participated in the first SKE48 audition, held in July 2008, and was selected to join the group.

Career

SKE48 and Nogizaka46 

Team S made its debut on October 5, 2008. She was also chosen to be in the main lineup for AKB48's single "10nen Zakura". Her first photobook, titled Kingyo, was published on March 1, 2012. In April 2013, SKE48 reorganized the teams, and Matsui was appointed the captain of Team E.  In AKB48's 2013 General Election, she placed seventh overall with 73,173 votes.

In the AKB48 Group Daisokaku Matsuri, held February 24, 2014, she became a member of Nogizaka46 while remaining in SKE48's Team E. She made her debut as a member of Nogizaka46 during the group's handshake event for their single "Kizuitara Katamoi" at the Makuhari Messe convention center in Chiba on April 13, 2014. For her first performance with Nogizaka46, Rena Matsui performed "Kizuitara Kataomoi" with the other members of the group. She published her second photobook, titled Hemeretto, on April 1, 2014.  In AKB48's 2014 General Election, she placed fifth overall with 69,790 votes. On March 26, 2015, during a concert at Saitama Super Arena, it was announced that her concurrent position in Nogizaka46 would be cancelled.

On June 11, 2015, she announced that she would graduate from SKE48 at the end of August. Her graduation concert, titled "Matsui Rena SKE48 Graduation Concert in Toyota Stadium: 2588 Days" was held on August 30, 2015, at Toyota Stadium. Her last performance with SKE48 occurred the following day.

Acting 

Since graduating from SKE48, Matsui has worked as an actress in several TV series and films, including Kamen Rider Build the Movie: Be the One and the ninety-ninth NHK asadora Manpuku. Matsui opened her YouTube channel in 2021.

Writing 

Matsui made her debut as a fiction writer in 2018, publishing the short story "Nugutte mo, nugutte mo" in the literary journal Subaru. The story was included in her first short story collection, titled  Camouflage, which was published by Shueisha in 2019. Her second book of fiction, titled Ruirui and consisting of five connected stories, was published by Shueisha in 2021. That same year a collection of previously published and new essays about her experiences with food, titled Secret Food, was published by Magazine House.

Bibliography

Photobooks

Discography

Singles with SKE48

Singles with AKB48

Singles with Nogizaka46

Solo singles

Stage units 
Team S 1st Stage
クラスメイト (Classmate)
星の温度 (Hoshi no ondo)
Team S 2nd Stage
雨のピアニスト (Ame no Pianist (1st Unit))
チョコの行方 (Choco no Yukue (2nd Unit))
Team S 3rd Stage
枯葉のステーション (Kareha no Station (Solo))
Omoide Ijou (2nd Unit)
Team E 3rd Stage 
ヒグラシノコ (Higurashi no Koi)
Team E 4th Stage
この胸のバーコード (Kono Mune no Barcode)

Filmography

Films

Television

Radio

Theater

References

External links

  at grick 

Living people
1991 births
Japanese women pop singers
21st-century Japanese novelists
21st-century Japanese women writers
Japanese idols
Japanese voice actresses
SKE48 members
Nogizaka46 members
Japanese trumpeters
Women trumpeters
Musicians from Aichi Prefecture
People from Toyohashi